Afterwards is a 2008 English-language psychological thriller film directed by Gilles Bourdos and starring Romain Duris, John Malkovich and Evangeline Lilly. Based on Guillaume Musso's novel Et après..., the story tells of a workaholic lawyer who is told by a self-proclaimed visionary that he must try to prevent his imminent death. The film was shot in New York City, Montreal and various New Mexico locations over June to July 2007, and had a French release in January 2009.

Premise
As a child, Nathan Del Amico (Duris) 'dies' in an accident, but comes 'back'. Years later, now a career-driven New York plaintiff's lawyer obsessed with work, he meets Joseph Kay (Malkovich), a doctor who claims that he can foresee other people's deaths, and that he is a "messenger" sent to help Nathan put his life's priorities in order. 
Nathan and his wife (Lilly) had recently lost their son to SIDS, leading to their divorce.  Once Nathan is convinced about the doctor's ability, he visits his former wife and daughter in New Mexico.

Cast
 Romain Duris as Nathan Del Amico, a workaholic New York lawyer whose success has led him to neglect his wife and daughter
 John Malkovich as Joseph Kay, a doctor who claims to be able to predict people's deaths
 Evangeline Lilly as Claire, Nathan's recently divorced wife and childhood sweetheart
 Reece Thompson as Jeremy
 Sara Waisglass as Tracey, the daughter
 Sophi Knight as 7 year old Claire
Morgan Costa Rouchy as 7 year old Nathan Del Amico

Production
Gilles Bourdos and Michel Spinosa wrote Afterwards as a film adaptation of Guillaume Musso's French novel Et après.... The film, a C$10 million co-production between Canada's Christal Films Productions and France's Fidélité Films, was filmed over six weeks in New York, Quebec and New Mexico. Filming in Manhattan commenced on June 4, 2007. Production moved to New Mexico from June 15–19, where scenes were shot at various locations in Albuquerque, Alamogordo, Jemez Springs and Tularosa. Filming resumed in Montreal on July 7 and lasted for approximately 25 days; the city was chosen as a filming location for its tax deduction incentives and the ease in making "Montreal look like anywhere in the world". Though writer/director Bourdos is French, as is Musso's adapted novel and co-financier Christal Films Productions, Afterwards was shot almost entirely in English.

Release
The film had its world premiere on September 7, 2008 at the 2008 Toronto International Film Festival, looking for a U.S. distribution buyer. It was theatrically released by Mars Distribution on January 14, 2009 in France and Belgium, earning US$159,500 from 250 screens on its opening weekend in France. It went on to gross $1.1 million in its first week and ranked fifth in the Paris area.

Seville Pictures bought the rights to the film's Canadian distribution from Christal Films, which also produced the film and provided 30% of finances.

References

External links
 

2008 films
Canadian psychological thriller films
French psychological thriller films
2008 psychological thriller films
Films based on French novels
Films shot in New York City
Films shot in Montreal
Films shot in New Mexico
Films set in Manhattan
Films scored by Alexandre Desplat
Mr. Mudd films
Films directed by Gilles Bourdos
English-language Canadian films
English-language French films
2000s English-language films
2000s Canadian films
2000s French films